Jin Yang (born in Harbin) is a Chinese male pair skater.  With current partner Peng Cheng, he is a two-time Four Continents medalist (silver in 2020, bronze in 2019), two-time Grand Prix Final silver medalist (2018–19, 2019–20), and the 2017 Asian Winter Games silver medalist.  Peng/Jin represented China at the 2018 Winter Olympics and the 2022 Winter Olympics.

With former partner Yu Xiaoyu, he is a two-time (2014, 2015) World Junior champion, the 2012 World Junior silver medalist, the 2012 Winter Youth Olympics champion, the 2013–2014 JGP Final champion, and the 2016 Four Continents bronze medalist.

Career

Partnership with Yu Xiaoyu
Yang Jin were paired together by their coaches in 2009. They do on- and off-ice training from eight in the morning to five in the afternoon with a break in the middle.

2010–11 season
Yu/Jin won the silver medal at the 2010 Chinese Nationals. They made their international debut during the 2010–11 season. They won bronze at JGP Cup of Austria and then won gold at Czech Skate. They won the bronze medal at the Junior Grand Prix Final.

2011–12 season

The pair performed a quad twist at a national competition in 2011 when Yu was 15 and Jin was 17 years old (or 13 and 22). They finished seventh at the 2011 Skate Canada and sixth at the 2011 Cup of China. They then won the bronze medal at their national championships. Yu/Jin competed at the 2012 World Junior Championships and won the silver medal behind teammates and training partners Sui Wenjing/Han Cong.

2012–13 season
In the 2012-13 season, Yu/Jin finished fourth in JGP Austria and second in JGP Croatia in their JGP Events. They finished fifth at the JGP Final. Yu/Jin then competed at the 2013 World Junior Championships and finished fourth.

2013–14 season
Prior to the 2013-14 season, Yu/Jin changed coaches, moving from Luan Bo to Olympic pairs champion Zhao Hongbo, Yao Bin, and Han Bing. They won the gold medals in their JGP events at the 2013 JGP Latvia and 2013 JGP Estonia, qualifying them for their fourth JGP Final in Fukuoka, Japan where they won the gold medal. Yu/Jin finished their perfect season by winning gold at the 2014 World Junior Championships in Sofia, Bulgaria.

2014–15 season
In the 2014-15 season, Yu/Jin made their official senior debut on the Grand Prix circuit. They won a silver medal at the 2014 Cup of China and a bronze medal at the 2014 NHK Trophy, qualifying them for their first senior Grand Prix Final in Barcelona, Spain. At the Grand Prix Final, they set new personal bests in the short program and free skate to finish in 5th place. They then won their second national title.

With the surprise comeback of Pang/Tong, Yu/Jin were not given a spot to compete at the Four Continents Championships in Seoul and the World Championships in Shanghai, China. Instead, they were sent to the 2015 Winter Universiade, where they won the gold medal. It was later announced that they would compete at the 2015 World Junior Figure Skating Championships in Tallinn, Estonia. Despite training senior program layouts for much of the season, they successfully defended their Junior World title, winning both segments of the competition.

2015–16 season
Yu/Jin were assigned to Cup of China and NHK Trophy. They attempted their first throw quadruple salchow in competition at the Cup of China and won a bronze medal. They then went on to win silver at 2015 NHK Trophy which helped qualify them for the 2015–16 Grand Prix Final in Barcelona.

At the 2016 Four Continents Championships, Yu/Jin won the bronze medal.

Partnership with Peng Cheng

2016–17 season
On April 14, 2016, International Figure Skating magazine broke the news of Peng's new partnership with Jin Yang. The Chinese Skating Association decided to switch partners between the two pairs of Peng/Zhang and Yu/Jin.

Peng/Jin debuted on the Grand Prix with two silver medals at the 2016 Cup of China and the 2016 NHK Trophy, earning a place in the Grand Prix Final, where they finished sixth.  They won their first national title at the 2017 Chinese Championships.

Competing at the 2017 Four Continents Championships, their first ISU Championship event, they placed fifth.  At the 2017 Asian Winter Games, Peng/Jin won the silver medal behind Yu/Zhang.  This concluded their season.

2017–18 season
The two won the 2017 CS Finlandia Trophy, their first international gold medal together.  The Grand Prix was a disappointment, with Peng/Jin finishing fifth at both the 2017 Skate America and 2017 Internationaux de France.  At the 2018 Chinese Championships, they finished second behind Yu/Zhang and were named to China's team for the 2018 Winter Olympics.

Peng/Jin competed in the pairs event in Pyeongchang, finishing seventeenth in the short program and thus missing the free skate by a single ordinal.  Their season concluded at the 2018 World Championships, where they finished ninth.

2018–19 season
With both Sui Wenjing / Han Cong and Yu/Zhang sidelined by injury at the beginning of the season, Peng/Jin were the only Chinese pair team competing internationally on the senior level.  They began with a gold medal at the 2018 CS Asian Open.

On the Grand Prix, Peng/Jin began at the 2018 Skate Canada International, where they won the silver medal, finishing ahead of the bronze medalists Kirsten Moore-Towers / Michael Marinaro by 0.15 points.  The two struggled on their side-by-side jumps in the free skate, where they finished fourth, an area where Jin said they hoped to improve.  At the 2018 NHK Trophy, they won a second silver medal by a far more decisive margin.  They qualified for the Grand Prix Final, with Peng noting that "we feel like we miss our teammates, but advancing to the Grand Prix Final is something we are proud of."  At the Final, they placed first in the short program and second in the free skate, winning silver overall.  This was the team's first major international medal.

They won their second national title at the 2019 Chinese Championships.  At the 2019 Four Continents Championships in Anaheim, they placed third in the short program behind Moore-Towers/Marinaro and a returning Sui/Han, in consequence of Peng falling on their throw jump.  They also came third in the free skate, making an error on the side-by-side triple Salchow jumps, finishing third overall, their first ISU Championship medal.  Peng commented, "despite the success rate of the triple jump in the training, we want to try that and challenge ourselves and show what we have done in our training."

Concluding the season at the 2019 World Championships, Peng/Jin placed third in the short program, earning a small bronze medal.  They came fifth in the free skate due to Peng underrotating her triple Salchow attempt and finished fourth overall, off the podium, by 1.97 points.  Jin reflected on the season: " We are satisfied with overall performances. We could pull out what we can. Of course, for some details, there are some areas to improve. The biggest accomplishment this season is to get our names out so that judges recognize us. For next season, we continue to improve our performance."

2019–20 season
Peng/Jin debuted at the 2019 CS U.S. Classic, taking the bronze medal.  They then won the 2019 Shanghai Trophy.

On the Grand Prix series, Peng/Jin first competed at 2019 Skate America, placing first in the short program despite Peng stepping out on and underrotating her side-by-side jump.  They also placed first in the free skate, despite a fall on a throw triple loop, taking their first Grand Prix gold medal together.  They did not skate in the gala because the throw jump fell impacted Peng's foot.  At their second event, the 2019 Cup of China, Peng/Jin placed narrowly third in the short program after Peng fell on a jump and they had unison issues with their spins.  They rose to second place and the silver medal in the free skate.

Qualifying for the Grand Prix Final, Peng/Jin lost their skates on the way there and consequently could not practice for five days. However, they were ultimately returned the day before the competition began.  They were fifth in the short program following Peng putting her foot down on their throw triple loop.  Jin said that Peng's ankle injury from Skate America was "quite stubborn and not becoming better," impacting their training.  They skated cleanly in the free skate, narrowly placing first in that segment, and rose to second place overall, winning their second consecutive Final silver medal.

Peng/Jin skated cleanly to place second in the short program at the 2020 Four Continents Championships in Seoul.  Jin said they were quite satisfied with their performance. At the same time, Peng revealed that sickness and a leg injury had impacted their training after the Grand Prix Final.  Second in the free skate as well, with only a step out on a throw triple loop, they won the silver medal behind Sui/Han.  They were assigned to compete at the World Championships in Montreal, but these were cancelled as a result of the coronavirus pandemic.

2020–21 season
With the pandemic continuing to affect international travel, the ISU assigned the Grand Prix based mainly on geography, with Peng/Jin being assigned to the 2020 Cup of China.  Following withdrawals from some other Chinese teams, including Sui/Han, Peng/Jin won the gold medal by almost 50 points out of the three teams attending.

In March at the 2021 World Championships in Stockholm, Peng fell at the beginning of the short program, breaking one of the zippers on her dress, but continued the performance and put her hand down on her underrotated jump attempt. They placed fifth in that segment. Peng also made errors on both jumps in the free skate, and they placed sixth in that segment but remained in fifth place overall.

2021–22 season
Peng/Jin's first Grand Prix assignment was initially the 2021 Cup of China, but following its cancellation, they were reassigned to the 2021 Gran Premio d'Italia. Making their season debut, they placed second in both segments to take the silver medal behind Sui/Han. The Chinese federation opted to withdraw them from their second event, the 2021 Internationaux de France, as a result of which they could not qualify for the Grand Prix Final.

Assigned to the Chinese Olympic team, Peng/Jin began the 2022 Winter Olympics as their country's entry in the pairs free skate segment of the Olympic team event. They were third in the segment despite Peng's multiple jump errors and their final lift exiting early, while the Chinese team finished in fifth place. In the pairs event, Peng/Jin were fifth in the short program. In the free skate, Peng underrotated and stepped out of her triple Salchow attempt, but they placed sixth in the segment and remained fifth overall. Jin said they had been under "great pressure because we had the disappointing score" at the previous Olympics and failed to qualify for the free skate but that they were pleased to have performed well in Beijing.

2022–23 season
Peng and Jin were slated to compete at the 2022 Grand Prix of Espoo and 2022 Grand Prix de France, but withdrew from both events.

Programs

With Peng

With Yu

Competitive highlights
GP: Grand Prix; CS: Challenger Series; JGP: Junior Grand Prix

With Peng

With Yu

Detailed results

With Peng

References

External links

 
 

Living people
1994 births
Chinese male pair skaters
Figure skaters from Harbin
Four Continents Figure Skating Championships medalists
World Junior Figure Skating Championships medalists
Figure skaters at the 2017 Asian Winter Games
Medalists at the 2017 Asian Winter Games
Asian Games silver medalists for China
Universiade medalists in figure skating
Figure skaters at the 2018 Winter Olympics
Figure skaters at the 2022 Winter Olympics
Olympic figure skaters of China
Asian Games medalists in figure skating
Figure skaters at the 2012 Winter Youth Olympics
Youth Olympic gold medalists for China
Universiade gold medalists for China
Competitors at the 2015 Winter Universiade
20th-century Chinese people
21st-century Chinese people